Stanisław Franciszek Baran (26 April 1920 – 12 May 1993) was an interwar Polish football player, who started his career in Resovia Rzeszów, then, sometime in 1938 (at the age of around 18) moved to Warszawianka Warszawa. Regarded as one of the most gifted players of these times, however World War II stopped his career for a few years.

Baran was a member of the Polish National Team in 1938 FIFA World Cup, but did not play in the legendary game Poland – Brazil 5–6 (5 June 1938, Strasbourg, France) – he spent the whole match on the bench. Also, played in the last international friendly of interwar Poland (Poland – Hungary 4–2, 27 August 1939, Warsaw). In this game, he appeared on the field as a replacement, in 31st minute.

In 1958, as a 38-year-old footballing veteran, Baran won the championships of Poland, with the team of ŁKS Łódź.

See also
 The last game: August 27, 1939. Poland - Hungary 4-2
 Polish Roster in World Cup Soccer France 1938

1920 births
1993 deaths
Polish footballers
Poland international footballers
ŁKS Łódź players
Lechia Gdańsk players
1938 FIFA World Cup players
People from Ropczyce-Sędziszów County
Polish football managers
ŁKS Łódź managers
Sportspeople from Podkarpackie Voivodeship
Association football forwards
KS Warszawianka players
Footballers from Łódź